Eileen DeSandre is an American stage actor and a member of the Actors' Equity Association. Known for much of her career as a character actor in the Oregon Shakespeare Festival in Ashland, Oregon, she has more recently taken lead roles in a variety of theaters. She has an M.F.A. in acting from Pennsylvania State University, and a B.A. in French and theater from Seton Hill University.

Recent roles
 2020. Dr. Ruth Westheimer, Becoming Dr. Ruth, Orlando Shakes, Orlando, FL.
 2019. Bella Sacker, Fragments, Rogue Theater Company, Ashland, OR.
 2014. Dr. Ruth Westheimer, Becoming Dr. Ruth, Virginia Repertory Theatre, Richmond, VA.
 2013. Miss Helen, The Road to Mecca, Profile Theater, Portland, OR. This role earned her critical acclaim and a Drammy Award for Actress in a Lead Role.
 2012.  Louise, Private Lives, Rubicon Theatre, Ventura, CA.
 2011. Mom, Spin Cycle, Innovation Theatre Works, Bend OR.
 2011. Joan of Arc, Joan of Arc at the Stake (Jeanne d'Arc au bûcher), Oregon Bach Festival, Eugene, OR.
 2010. Nurse, Romeo and Juliet, The Riverside Theatre, New York, NY.

Oregon Shakespeare Festival roles
 2015. Verges, in Much Ado About Nothing
 2009. Brighella, Ensemble in The Servant of Two Masters
 2009. Bertha Katz in Paradise Lost (play)
 2008. Flute in A Midsummer Night's Dream
 2008. Madaniḱā in The Clay Cart
 2007. Mme. Pernelle in Tartuffe
 2007. Gertrud in On the Razzle
 2006. Emilia, Ensemble in The Winter's Tale
 2006. Speed in The Two Gentlemen of Verona
 2005. Sasha Smirnoff in Room Service
 2005. Holofernes in Love's Labor's Lost
 2004. Dr. Pinch, Ensemble in The Comedy of Errors
 2004. Della in The Royal Family
 2003. Monica Reed in Present Laughter
 2003. Juliana Tesman in Hedda Gabler
 2002. Popilius Lena and Clitus in Julius Caesar
 2002. Aunt Meme in Saturday, Sunday, Monday
 2001. Heidi in Fuddy Meers
 2001. Andromache in Troilus and Cressida
 2000. Nurse Preen in The Man Who Came to Dinner
 1999. Go-to-Hell Kitty in Chicago
 1999. Mrs. Helseth in Rosmersholm
 1998. Mrs. Candour in The School for Scandal
 1998. Maria Vasilyevna in Uncle Vanya
 1997/98. Maddalena Guarneri in the Oregon Shakespeare Festival and Kennedy Center productions of The Magic Fire
 1997. Amira in Pentecost
 1996. Emilia in The Winter's Tale
 1996. Bessie Berger in Awake and Sing!
 1995. Maria in Twelfth Night
 1995. The Maid in Blood Wedding
 1994. Rhea in You Can't Take It with You

Early roles
DeSandre has also performed with Milwaukee Repertory Theater, Bloomsburg Theatre Ensemble, Theatre of East Carolina, Fulton Opera House, St. Vincent Theatre, Theatre for the New City, Promenade Theatre, and INTAR.

References

External links
 Oregon Shakespeare Festival

American stage actresses
Year of birth missing (living people)
Living people
Penn State College of Arts and Architecture alumni
Seton Hill University alumni
21st-century American women